Waffle fabric, also known as honeycomb fabric, has raised threads that form small rectangles. It can be made by either weaving or knitting. Waffle weave is a further exploitation of plain weave and twill weave which produces a three-dimensional effect. The combination of warp and weft floats creates the structure. It is woven partly on tabby areas surrounded by ridges of long floats. The weave consists of warp and weft floats arranged around a plain weave center. The warp and weft threads are interlaced and floating in a way that creates small square ridges and hollows in the fabric in a regular pattern.

The surface of the fabric has a texture that looks like a waffle, hence the name.

Waffle fabric can also be made on a double jersey knitting machine by selecting the needle position for knitting and tucking the loops for the formation of the structure similar to floating warps and weft in weaving. The knitted waffle can be produced in two variants: big waffle and mini waffle; it is also known as thermal fabric.

Characteristics 
The "face" is a weaver's term that refers to whether the warp or weft dominates the fabric. The three-dimensional face/texture of waffle make it more absorbent and a useful fabric. Waffle fabric is usually made of cotton or microfibre and is woven in a way that makes it very absorbent. The waffle weave also allows air to flow through the fabric so that it dries quickly. Waffle fabrics are made in a range of weights.

Uses 
Waffle fabric is used in apparel, bathrobes, dish towels, and wipes for cleaning surfaces. The texture makes it more absorbent.

Citations 

Woven fabrics
Knitted fabrics